General Abdillahi Fadal Iman was a Somaliland military official, who served as the Chief of Somaliland Police Force until his death in November 2019.

See also

 Somaliland Police
 Somaliland Armed Forces
 Ministry of Defence (Somaliland)
 List of Somalis

References

People from Hargeisa
Somalian politicians
1960 births
2019 deaths